Grange Calveley (6 May 1943 – 22 August 2021) was a British writer and artist who was best known as the creator of the BBC's animated television series Roobarb (1974) and Noah and Nelly in... SkylArk (1977).

Calveley also wrote and made character drawings for the 2005 revival series, Roobarb and Custard Too. The series was commissioned by UK's Channel FIVE and directed by Jason Tammenagi.

Early life
Grange Calveley was born on 6 May 1943 in Cheshire, England. His father was with the Scots Guards and was killed at Arezzo in 1944.

After Art College, Calveley worked for a number of advertising agencies in London. It was while at Masius that he met his wife Hanny, a copywriter.

Roobarb
The Roobarb cartoon character is loosely based on Calveley's own dog, a Welsh Border Collie. Custard was drawn after the huge cat who lived next door.

The Roobarb (1974) television series was commissioned by the BBC, who sold the series to more than 40 countries around the world. In his book, Roobarb: An Illuminated Biogwoofy, Calveley describes how the real dog would leap up into the fork of a tree and how the dog's antics became part of the cartoon's opening title. Roobarb was directed by Bob Godfrey, the series' music was by John Hawksworth and the stories were narrated by Richard Briers.

The characteristic bouncy wobbly style known as "boiling" was used as Calveley and the other animators did not have enough money to use traditional cel methods and used marker pens on paper instead.

Other works
Roobarb was followed in 1977 by Noah and Nelly in... SkylArk.  In the late 70s Calveley and his family moved to Australia where he produced two further TV series, Captain Cookaburra's Road to Discovery (1985) and in 2005 a sequel to Roobarb called Roobarb and Custard Too.

Away from television, Calveley was the author of the series of children's books One to Five.

Calveley died on 22 August 2021 after suffering a stroke 12 days previously.

References

External links
 http://www.grangecalveley.com
 
 Video interview of Grange Calveley at BBC Cult TV site
 Roobarb and Custard's new series

1943 births
2021 deaths
British cartoonists
People from Cheshire